Robert Blackwood (April 1752 – 31 January 1785), was an Anglo-Irish politician.

Blackwood was the eldest son of Sir John Blackwood, 2nd Baronet, and Dorcas Stevenson, later Baroness Dufferin and Claneboye. He was returned to the Irish Parliament for Killyleagh in 1776, a seat he held until his death nine years later. He died in Belfast in January 1785, after a fall from his horse. He never married and his younger brother James eventually succeeded their father in the baronetcy and their mother in the barony.

References

1752 births
1785 deaths
Irish MPs 1776–1783
Irish MPs 1783–1790
Heirs apparent who never acceded
Robert
Members of the Parliament of Ireland (pre-1801) for County Down constituencies